Jungbu-dong is a dong or a neighbourhood of the Gyeongju City, North Gyeongsang province, South Korea. It is bordered by Songdong-dong and Hwango-dong on the east, Seonggeon-dong on the west, Hwangnam-dong on the south and Hwangseong-dong on the north. Its 0.93 square kilometers are home to about 6,894 people. It is an administrative dong that consists of five legal dongs such as Seobu-dong, Dongbu-dong, Bukbu-dong, Noseo-dong, and Nodong-dong.

Jungbu-dong has two elementary schools and one middle school.

See also
Subdivisions of Gyeongju
Administrative divisions of South Korea

References

External links
 The official site of the Jungbu-dong office

Subdivisions of Gyeongju
Neighbourhoods in South Korea